The first Nanda ministry was formed as an interim cabinet upon the death in office of Jawaharlal Nehru on 27 May 1964.

Cabinet

Cabinet ministers

|}

Ministers of State

|}

References

Indian_union_ministries
1964 in India